Heftsiba was a large construction company in Israel until its collapse in 2007. The company was founded in 1968 by Mordecai Yonah  and was named after his wife, Hefsiba. At the end of the 80s, Boaz Yonah, Mordecai's son assumed the position of the company's management.

References

Construction and civil engineering companies of Israel
Defunct companies of Israel
Companies disestablished in 2007